National Donut Day or National Doughnut Day, celebrated in the United States and in some other countries, is on the first Friday of June of each year, succeeding the doughnut event created by The Salvation Army in Chicago in 1938 to honor those of their members who served doughnuts to soldiers during World War I. The holiday celebrates the doughnut. Many American doughnut stores offer free doughnuts on  the occasion.

History

National Donut Day started in 1938 as a fundraiser for Chicago's The Salvation Army. Their goal was to help those in need during the Great Depression, and to honor the Salvation Army "Lassies" of World War I, who served doughnuts to soldiers.

Soon after the entrance of the United States into World War I in 1917, the Salvation Army sent a fact-finding mission to France. The mission concluded that the needs of American enlisted men could be met by canteens/social centers termed "huts" that could serve baked goods, provide writing supplies and stamps, and provide a clothes-mending service. Typically, six staff members per hut would include four female volunteers who could "mother" the boys. These huts were established by the Salvation Army in the United States near army training centers.

About 250 Salvation Army volunteers went to France. Because of the difficulties of providing freshly baked goods from huts established in abandoned buildings near to the front lines, the two Salvation Army volunteers (Ensign Margaret Sheldon and Adjutant Helen Purviance) came up with the idea of providing doughnuts. These are reported to have been an "instant hit", and "soon many soldiers were visiting the Salvation Army huts". Margaret Sheldon wrote of one busy day: "Today I made 22 pies, 300 doughnuts, 700 cups of coffee."

Soon, the women who did this work became known by the servicemen as "Doughnut Girls".

A misconception has taken hold that the provision of doughnuts to enlisted men in World War I is the origin of the term "doughboy" to describe U.S. infantry. However, the term was in use as early as the Mexican–American War of 1846–47.

In the Second World War, Red Cross Volunteers also distributed doughnuts, and it became routine to refer to the Red Cross girls as Doughnut Dollies as well.

In Chicago and other cities, National Donut Day is still a fundraiser for the Salvation Army. In 2017, the organization joined with Russ's Market, Super Saver, LaMar's Donuts, Hurts Donut and Krispy Kreme in Lincoln, Nebraska and Tempe, Arizona to raise funds on National Donut Day.

There are three other doughnut holidays, the origins of which are obscure. National Jelly-Filled Doughnut Day is recognized as June 8 (occasionally as June 9). National Cream-Filled Doughnut Day is celebrated on September 14 although there is also a National Boston Cream Pie Day observed October 23rd. Buy a Doughnut Day occurs on October 30.

The birthday of the United States Marine Corps (November 10), was once referred to as National Donut Day, in a successful ruse by American prisoners of war at Son Tay prison camp to trick the North Vietnamese into giving out donuts in honor of the occasion. A second National Donut Day is also celebrated on November 5th, which is speculated to have originated from this event.

Doughnut Day (Australia)
In the state of South Australia Donut Day (first Friday of June) is honoured with a partnership between Krispy Kreme and the Salvation Army and includes a celebrity donut decorating competition, donut giveaways, and the Red Shield Hope Donut whose profits go to supporting the Salvation Army's work in Australia.

In Australia in 2020, the term 'doughnut day' has become a reference to the shape being a 'zero', representing a day free of new coronavirus cases. It stemmed from 26 October 2020 when a Melbourne supermarket had sold out of doughnuts, taken to be a symbol of hope and recovery during a long period of lockdown.

See also

 List of food days
 List of doughnut varieties

Notes and references

Sources

 Those Extraordinary Women of World War I, Karen Zeinert, 2001
 Origins of "Doughboy", An Interim Report, by Michael E. Hanlon, June 16, 2003
 Holiday Insights : National Doughnut Day, or National Donut Day

External links

 

Doughnuts
Unofficial observances
June observances
Recurring events established in 1938
Observances about food and drink
Holidays and observances by scheduling (nth weekday of the month)